The Delaware National Guard consists of the Delaware Army National Guard, and the Delaware Air National Guard. It is a state agency of the government of Delaware. From February 2017 its commander, the State adjutant general, has been Major General Carol A. Timmons.

The Delaware National Guard comprises both Army and Air National Guard components. The Constitution of the United States specifically charges the National Guard with dual federal and state missions. In fact, the National Guard is the only United States military force empowered to function in a state status. Those functions range from limited actions during non-emergency situations to full scale law enforcement of martial law when local law enforcement officials can no longer maintain civil control.
The National Guard may be called into federal service in response to a call by the President or Congress.

When National Guard troops are called to federal service, the President serves as Commander-In-Chief. The federal mission assigned to the National Guard is: "To provide properly trained and equipped units for prompt mobilization for war, National emergency or as otherwise needed."

The Governor may call individuals or units of the Delaware National Guard into state service during emergencies or to assist in special situations which lend themselves to use of the National Guard. The state mission assigned to the National Guard is: "To provide trained and disciplined forces for domestic emergencies or as otherwise provided by state law."

The Delaware State Guard served as the state defense force of Delaware during World War I and World War II to execute the stateside duties of the Delaware National Guard while the National Guard was deployed abroad.
A Delaware state defense force is authorized by both the State Code of Delaware and Executive Order. It would be the state's authorized militia and assume the state mission of the Delaware National Guard in the event the Guard is mobilized. It would comprise retired active and reserve military personnel and selected other persons who would volunteer their time and talents for Delaware.

Delaware National Guard State Awards
  Delaware Conspicuous Service Cross
  Delaware Distinguished Service Medal
  Delaware Medal for Military Merit
  Delaware National Guard Medal
  Delaware National Defense Service Ribbon
  Delaware Medal for Service in Aid to Civil Authority
  Delaware Recruiting Ribbon
  Delaware Physical Fitness Ribbon
  Delaware National Guard Governor's Meritorious Unit Award
  Delaware National Guard Unit Strength Award

See also
 Hugh T. Broomall
 198th Signal Battalion (United States) 
 261st Theater Tactical Signal Brigade (United States)
 Francis D. Vavala

References

External links

Bibliography of Delaware Army National Guard History compiled by the United States Army Center of Military History
Delaware Air National Guard homepage

National Guard (United States)
Military in Delaware
State agencies of Delaware